
Year 1578 (MDLXXVIII) was a common year starting on Wednesday (link will display the full calendar) of the Julian calendar.

Events 
 January–June 
 January 31 – Battle of Gembloux: Spanish forces under Don John of Austria and Alexander Farnese defeat the Dutch; Farnese begins to recover control of the French-speaking Southern Netherlands.
 April 27 – The Duel of the Mignons claims the lives of two favorites of Henry III of France, and two favourites of Henry I, Duke of Guise.
 May 26 – The Alteratie in Amsterdam ends Catholic rule, and opens Catholic worship there.
 May 31 – Martin Frobisher sails from Harwich, England to Frobisher Bay, Canada, on his third expedition.
 June 11 – Humphrey Gilbert is granted letters patent from the English crown to establish a colony in North America.

 July–December 
 July – Martin Frobisher holds the first Thanksgiving celebration by Europeans in North America, on Newfoundland. He ships ore, which proves to be valueless fool's gold, which can only be used as road metal in London.
 August 4 – Battle of Alcácer Quibir in North Africa: The Moors defeat King Sebastian of Portugal, who is killed, leaving his elderly uncle, Cardinal Henry, as his heir, initiating a succession crisis in Portugal.
 August 20–September 6 – Francis Drake, during his circumnavigation, passes through the Strait of Magellan in his ship, the newly renamed Golden Hind.
 October 1 – Alessandro Farnese succeeds his uncle, Don John, as Governor of the Spanish Netherlands.
 October 21 – Battle of Wenden: The Russians are defeated by the Swedes, who proceed to take Polotsk.
 November 19 – Humphrey Gilbert and Walter Ralegh set out from Plymouth in England, leading an expedition to establish a colony in North America; forced to turn back six months later.

 Date unknown 
 Battle of the Spoiling Dyke at Trumpan on the Scottish Isle of Skye: the Clan MacLeod are victorious over the MacDonalds of Uist in a feud.
 The Ottoman Empire conquers Abkhazia.
 Sarsa Dengel, Emperor of Ethiopia, defeats and kills Bahr negus Yeshaq along with his Ottoman allies, finally ending his rebellion.
 Sonam Gyrso receives from Prince Atlan Khan the title of Talaï, and becomes the third Dalai Lama of Tibet.
 The last outbreak of sweating sickness occurs in England.
 The Portuguese assist Lord Ōmura Sumitada, the first Christian Japanese diamyo, in repulsing an assault on Nagasaki by the Ryūzōji clan.
 Fur trade begins in Newfoundland in North America.

Births 

 January 7 – Agnes of Solms-Laubach, Landgravine of Hesse-Kassel (d. 1602)
 January 10 – Christopher Clitherow, Lord Mayor of London and Member of Parliament (d. 1641)
 January 28 – Cornelius Haga, Dutch diplomat (d. 1654)
 March 18 – Adam Elsheimer, German artist working in Rome, who died at only thirty-two (d. 1610)
 April 1 – William Harvey, English physician (d. 1657)
 April 14 – King Philip III of Spain (d. 1621)
 April 17 – Maximilian van der Sandt, Dutch theologian (d. 1656)
 May 11 – Christian Günther I, Count of Schwarzburg-Sondershausen (1601–1642) (d. 1642)
 June 5 – Claude, Duke of Chevreuse (d. 1657)
 June 13 – Thomas Finch, 2nd Earl of Winchilsea, Member of Parliament (d. 1639)
 July 9 – Ferdinand II, Holy Roman Emperor (d. 1637)
 July 21 – Philipp Hainhofer, German merchant, banker, diplomat and art collector (d. 1647)
 July 27 – Frances Howard, Duchess of Richmond, British duchess (d. 1639)
 July 31 – Countess Catharina Belgica of Nassau, regent of Hanau-Münzenberg (d. 1648)
 August 5 – Charles d'Albert, duc de Luynes, first duke of Chaulnes (d. 1621)
 August 10 – Matteo Rosselli, Italian painter (d. 1650)
 August 17
 Francesco Albani, Italian painter (d. 1660)
 Johann, Prince of Hohenzollern-Sigmaringen, first prince of Hohenzollern-Sigmaringen (d. 1638)
 August 24 – John Taylor, English poet who dubbed himself The Water Poet (d. 1653)
 September 11 – Vincenzo Maculani, Italian Catholic cardinal (d. 1667)
 September 17 – John Prideaux, English academic administrator and Anglican bishop (d. 1650)
 October 4 – Giovanni Francesco Guidi di Bagno, Italian Catholic cardinal (d. 1641)
 October 12 – Baldassare Aloisi, Italian painter (d. 1638)
 October 19 – Christine of Hesse-Kassel, Duchess of Saxe-Eisenach and Saxe-Coburg (d. 1658)
 November 4 – Wolfgang Wilhelm, Count Palatine of Neuburg, Duke of Jülich and Berg (1614–1635) (d. 1653)
 November 6 – Maximilian of Liechtenstein, Austrian nobleman and Imperial General (d. 1645)
 December 2 – Agostino Agazzari, Italian composer and music theorist (d. 1640)
 December 7 – Okaji no Kata, Japanese concubine of Tokugawa Ieyasu (d. 1642)
 December 20 – Henry of Lorraine, Duke of Mayenne, French noble (d. 1621)
 December 28 – Henry Bulstrode, English Member of Parliament (d. 1643)
 December 30 – Ulrik of Denmark, Danish prince-bishop (d. 1624)
 approx. date – Fede Galizia, Italian painter
 date unknown
 Giambattista Andreini, Italian actor and playwright (d. 1650)
 Yamada Arinaga, Japanese retainer of the Shimazu clan (d. 1668)
 Benedetto Castelli, Italian scientist (d. 1643)
 Thomas Coventry, 1st Baron Coventry, English lawyer (d. 1640)
 Iwasa Matabei, Japanese painter (d. 1650)
 Samuel Jordan, American colonial legislator (d. 1623)
 Grzegorz IV Radziwiłł, Polish magnate (d. 1613)
 François Ravaillac, killer of Henry IV of France (d. 1610)
 Ambrose Rookwood, English Gunpowder Plot conspirator (d. 1606)
 Francis Manners, 6th Earl of Rutland (d. 1632)
 Horio Tadauji, Japanese daimyō (d. 1604)
 Everard Digby, English conspirator (d. 1606)

Deaths 

 January 5 – Giulio Clovio, Dalmatian painter (b. 1498)
 January 6 – Queen Inseong, Korean royal consort (b. 1514)
 January 25  – Mihrimah Sultan, Sultan Suleiman's daughter (b. 1522)
 February 5 or 1579  – Giovanni Battista Moroni, Italian painter (b. 1510)
 February 12 – Catherine of Austria, Queen of Portugal (b. 1507)
 March 3 
 Sebastiano Venier, Doge of Venice (b. 1496)
 Michael Kantakouzenos Şeytanoğlu, Ottoman Greek magnate (b. 1510)
 March 7 – Margaret Douglas, Countess of Lennox (b. 1515)
 March 29 
 Arthur Champernowne, English admiral (b. 1524)
 Louis I, Cardinal of Guise, French cardinal (b. 1527)
 April 2 – Marie Elisabeth of France, French princess (b. 1572)
 April 11 – Joanna of Austria, Grand Duchess of Tuscany, Austrian Archduchess (b. 1547)
 April 14 – James Hepburn, 4th Earl of Bothwell, consort of Mary, Queen of Scots (b. 1535)
 April 15 – Wolrad II, Count of Waldeck-Eisenberg (b. 1509)
 April 19 – Uesugi Kenshin, Japanese samurai and warlord (b. 1530)
 May 4 – Martin Eisengrein, German theologian (b. 1535)
 June 16 – Ioan Potcoavă, Russian Cossack ataman
 July 2 – Thomas Doughty, English explorer (executed)
 July 5 – Cristoforo Madruzzo, Italian Catholic cardinal (b. 1512)
 July 27 – Jane Lumley, English translator (b. 1537)
 August 4
 King Sebastian of Portugal (b. 1554)
 Thomas Stukley, English adventurer (b. 1525)
 Abu Marwan Abd al-Malik I Saadi, King of Morocco
 Abu Abdallah Mohammed II Saadi, King of Morocco
 August 8 – Amago Katsuhisa, Japanese nobleman (b. 1553)
 August 11 – Pedro Nunes, Portuguese mathematician (b. 1502)
 August 16 – Andrew Corbet, English landowner and politician (b. 1522)
 August 20 – Yamanaka Yukimori, Japanese samurai (b. 1545) 
 September – Pierre Lescot, French architect (b. 1510)
 September 3 – Giulio della Rovere, Italian Catholic cardinal (b. 1533)
 September 22 – Archduke Wenceslaus of Austria (b. 1561)
 October 1 – Don John of Austria, military leader (b. 1547)
 October 12 – Cornelius Gemma, Dutch astronomer and astrologer (b. 1535)
 October 18 – Ferdinand, Prince of Asturias, Spanish prince (b. 1571)
 December 3 – Gonzalo II Fernández de Córdoba, Governor of the Duchy of Milan (b. 1520)
 December – Nicholas Heath, Archbishop of York and Lord Chancellor of England (b. 1501)
 date unknown – Sabina, Duchess of Bavaria (b. 1528)

References